"Bellas" (English: "Beautiful") is a 2018 song by Dominican singer Anthony Santos and American singer Romeo Santos. The song was released on August 1, 2018. It served as the second single for Anthony's twenty-third studio album La Historia De Mi Vida: El Final, Vol. 1 (2018). It is also included in Romeo's fourth studio album Utopía (2019).

Charts

References

2018 singles
Romeo Santos songs
Spanish-language songs
Male vocal duets